Zamoshye is the name of several  rural localities in Russia.

Leningrad Oblast
As of 2010, six rural localities in Leningrad Oblast bear this name:
Zamoshye, Boksitogorsky District, Leningrad Oblast, a village in Samoylovskoye Settlement Municipal Formation of Boksitogorsky District
Zamoshye, Kirovsky District, Leningrad Oblast, a village under the administrative jurisdiction of Naziyevskoye Settlement Municipal Formation of Kirovsky District
Zamoshye, Osminskoye Settlement Municipal Formation, Luzhsky District, Leningrad Oblast, a village in Osminskoye Settlement Municipal Formation of Luzhsky District
Zamoshye, Zaklinskoye Settlement Municipal Formation, Luzhsky District, Leningrad Oblast, a village in Zaklinskoye Settlement Municipal Formation of Luzhsky District
Zamoshye, Slantsevsky District, Leningrad Oblast, a village in Staropolskoye Settlement Municipal Formation of Slantsevsky District
Zamoshye, Volkhovsky District, Leningrad Oblast, a village in Berezhkovskoye Settlement Municipal Formation of Volkhovsky District

Moscow Oblast
As of 2010, two rural localities in Moscow Oblast bear this name:
Zamoshye, Mozhaysky District, Moscow Oblast, a village in Poretskoye Rural Settlement of Mozhaysky District
Zamoshye, Shakhovskoy District, Moscow Oblast, a village in Stepankovskoye Rural Settlement of Shakhovskoy District

Novgorod Oblast
As of 2010, five rural localities in Novgorod Oblast bear this name:
Zamoshye, Krasnoborskoye Settlement, Kholmsky District, Novgorod Oblast, a village in Krasnoborskoye Settlement of Kholmsky District
Zamoshye, Morkhovskoye Settlement, Kholmsky District, Novgorod Oblast, a village in Morkhovskoye Settlement of Kholmsky District
Zamoshye, Lyubytinsky District, Novgorod Oblast, a village under the administrative jurisdiction of the urban-type settlement of Lyubytino in Lyubytinsky District
Zamoshye, Malovishersky District, Novgorod Oblast, a village in Burginskoye Settlement of Malovishersky District
Zamoshye, Starorussky District, Novgorod Oblast, a village in Velikoselskoye Settlement of Starorussky District

Pskov Oblast
As of 2010, fifteen rural localities in Pskov Oblast bear this name:
Zamoshye, Dedovichsky District, Pskov Oblast, a village in Dedovichsky District
Zamoshye (Yushkinskaya Rural Settlement), Gdovsky District, Pskov Oblast, a village in Gdovsky District; municipally, a part of Yushkinskaya Rural Settlement of that district
Zamoshye (Samolvovskaya Rural Settlement), Gdovsky District, Pskov Oblast, a village in Gdovsky District; municipally, a part of Samolvovskaya Rural Settlement of that district
Zamoshye, Loknyansky District, Pskov Oblast, a village in Loknyansky District
Zamoshye, Nevelsky District, Pskov Oblast, a village in Nevelsky District
Zamoshye (Kuleyskaya Rural Settlement), Pechorsky District, Pskov Oblast, a village in Pechorsky District; municipally, a part of Kuleyskaya Rural Settlement of that district
Zamoshye (Lavrovskaya Rural Settlement), Pechorsky District, Pskov Oblast, a village in Pechorsky District; municipally, a part of Lavrovskaya Rural Settlement of that district
Zamoshye, Plyussky District, Pskov Oblast, a village in Plyussky District
Zamoshye, Porkhovsky District, Pskov Oblast, a village in Porkhovsky District
Zamoshye (Toroshinskaya Rural Settlement), Pskovsky District, Pskov Oblast, a village in Pskovsky District; municipally, a part of Toroshinskaya Rural Settlement of that district
Zamoshye (Krasnoprudskaya Rural Settlement), Pskovsky District, Pskov Oblast, a village in Pskovsky District; municipally, a part of Krasnoprudskaya Rural Settlement of that district
Zamoshye (Seredkinskaya Rural Settlement), Pskovsky District, Pskov Oblast, a village in Pskovsky District; municipally, a part of Seredkinskaya Rural Settlement of that district
Zamoshye, Sebezhsky District, Pskov Oblast, a village in Sebezhsky District
Zamoshye (Maryinskaya Rural Settlement), Strugo-Krasnensky District, Pskov Oblast, a village in Strugo-Krasnensky District; municipally, a part of Maryinskaya Rural Settlement of that district
Zamoshye (Novoselskaya Rural Settlement), Strugo-Krasnensky District, Pskov Oblast, a village in Strugo-Krasnensky District; municipally, a part of Novoselskaya Rural Settlement of that district

Smolensk Oblast
As of 2010, five rural localities in Smolensk Oblast bear this name:
Zamoshye, Khislavichsky District, Smolensk Oblast, a village in Kozhukhovichskoye Rural Settlement of Khislavichsky District
Zamoshye, Novoduginsky District, Smolensk Oblast, a village in Vysokovskoye Rural Settlement of Novoduginsky District
Zamoshye, Ugransky District, Smolensk Oblast, a village in Znamenskoye Rural Settlement of Ugransky District
Zamoshye, Velizhsky District, Smolensk Oblast, a village in Budnitskoye Rural Settlement of Velizhsky District
Zamoshye, Yelninsky District, Smolensk Oblast, a village in Mazovskoye Rural Settlement of Yelninsky District

Tver Oblast
As of 2010, seven rural localities in Tver Oblast bear this name:
Zamoshye, Andreapolsky District, Tver Oblast, a village in Toropatskoye Rural Settlement of Andreapolsky District
Zamoshye, Kuvshinovsky District, Tver Oblast, a village in Tysyatskoye Rural Settlement of Kuvshinovsky District
Zamoshye, Oleninsky District, Tver Oblast, a village in Kholmetskoye Rural Settlement of Oleninsky District
Zamoshye, Ostashkovsky District, Tver Oblast, a village in Zamoshskoye Rural Settlement of Ostashkovsky District
Zamoshye, Selizharovsky District, Tver Oblast, a village in Dmitrovskoye Rural Settlement of Selizharovsky District
Zamoshye (railway crossing loop), Zapadnodvinsky District, Tver Oblast, a railway crossing loop in Zapadnodvinskoye Rural Settlement of Zapadnodvinsky District
Zamoshye (village), Zapadnodvinsky District, Tver Oblast, a village in Zapadnodvinskoye Rural Settlement of Zapadnodvinsky District

Vologda Oblast
As of 2010, five rural localities in Vologda Oblast bear this name:
Zamoshye, Babayevsky District, Vologda Oblast, a village in Toropovsky Selsoviet of Babayevsky District
Zamoshye, Belozersky District, Vologda Oblast, a village in Vizmensky Selsoviet of Belozersky District
Zamoshye, Sokolsky District, Vologda Oblast, a village in Zamoshsky Selsoviet of Sokolsky District
Zamoshye, Ust-Kubinsky District, Vologda Oblast, a village in Bogorodsky Selsoviet of Ust-Kubinsky District
Zamoshye, Vytegorsky District, Vologda Oblast, a village in Ankhimovsky Selsoviet of Vytegorsky District